Mikael Filipe Viana de Sousa (born 28 May 1999), simply known as Mikael, is a Brazilian footballer who plays as a forward for Brazilian club América Mineiro, on loan from Salernitana.

Club career
Born in Bacabal, Maranhão, Mikael joined Sport Recife's youth setup in 2017, after impressing on a trial at his hometown. After impressing with the under-20s, he made his first team debut on 4 February of the following year, coming on as a late substitute for fellow youth graduate Neto Moura in a 1–1 Campeonato Pernambucano away draw against Salgueiro.

On 18 February 2019, after being back with the under-20 side, Mikael was loaned to América-PE for the year's Pernambucano. Upon returning, he was again assigned to the under-20s while also featuring for the under-23s.

On 7 January 2020, Mikael joined Série B side Confiança also in a temporary deal. At the club he scored his first senior goal, netting his team's second in a 4–2 away win against Freipaulistano for the year's Copa do Nordeste on 8 February.

On 6 October 2020, Mikael was recalled by Sport. He made his Série A debut nine days later, replacing Marquinhos and scoring his team's third in a 3–5 home loss against Internacional.

On 31 January 2022, Mikael was loaned to Salernitana in Italy, with an option to buy and a conditional obligation to buy.

On 29 July 2022, Salernitana loaned Mikael to Internacional. On 2 February 2023, Mikael was loaned by América Mineiro.

Career statistics

References

External links
Sport Recife profile 

1999 births
Living people
Sportspeople from Maranhão
Brazilian footballers
Association football forwards
Campeonato Brasileiro Série A players
Campeonato Brasileiro Série B players
Serie A players
Sport Club do Recife players
América Futebol Clube (PE) players
Associação Desportiva Confiança players
U.S. Salernitana 1919 players
Sport Club Internacional players
América Futebol Clube (MG) players
Brazilian expatriate footballers
Expatriate footballers in Italy
Brazilian expatriate sportspeople in Italy